The Roc d'Orzival is a mountain of the Swiss Pennine Alps, overlooking Grimentz in the canton of Valais. It lies north of the Becs de Bosson, on the chain between the Val de Réchy and the Val d'Anniviers.

References

External links
 Roc d'Orzival on Hikr

Mountains of the Alps
Mountains of Valais
Mountains of Switzerland
Two-thousanders of Switzerland